The fourth government of Alberto Núñez Feijóo was formed on 7 September 2020, following the latter's reelection as President of Galicia by the Parliament of Galicia on 3 September and his swearing-in on 5 September, as a result of the People's Party (PP) emerging as the largest parliamentary force at the 2020 Galician regional election.

The cabinet comprised members of the PP and a number of independents.

Investiture

Council of Government
The Council of Government was structured into the office for the president, the two vice presidents and 11 ministries.

Notes

References

2020 establishments in Galicia (Spain)
Cabinets established in 2020
Cabinets of Galicia